Former infantry regiments of Canada
Military units and formations of Ontario



The Sault Ste. Marie Regiment was an infantry regiment of the Non-Permanent Active Militia of the Canadian Militia (now the Canadian Army). First Organized in 1913 as the 51st Soo Rifles, it was renamed in 1920 as The Soo Rifles and for the final time in 1923 as The Sault Ste. Marie Regiment. In 1936, the regiment was Amalgamated with A Company of The Algonquin Regiment to form The Sault Ste Marie and Sudbury Regiment – which continues to exist today as the 49th Field Artillery Regiment, RCA.

Lineage

The Sault Ste. Marie Regiment 

 Originated on 15 November, 1913, in Sault Ste. Marie, Ontario, as 8-Company Infantry Regiment, City Corps.
 Redesignated on 10 February, 1914, as the 51st Regiment Rifles.
 Redesignated on 16 February, 1914, as the 51st Regiment (The Soo Rifles).
 Redesignated on 15 August, 1914, as the 51st Regiment (Soo Rifles).
 Redesignated on 1 May, 1920, as The Soo Rifles.
 Redesignated on 1 September, 1923, as The Sault Ste. Marie Regiment.
 Amalgamated on 15 December, 1936, with the Headquarters and A Company of The Algonquin Regiment and redesignated The Sault Ste. Marie and Sudbury Regiment (MG) (now the 49th Field Artillery Regiment, RCA).

Lineage Chart

Perpetuations 

 119th (Algoma) Battalion, CEF
 227th (Sudbury-Manitoulin-Algoma) Battalion (Men o' the North), CEF

Organization

51st Regiment (The Soo Rifles) (16 February, 1914) 

 Regimental Headquarters (Sault Ste. Marie, ON)
 A Company
 B Company
 C Company
 D Company
 E Company
 F Company
 G Company
 H Company

51st Regiment (Soo Rifles) (01 March, 1916) 

 Regimental Headquarters (Sault Ste. Marie, ON)
 A Company
 B Company
 C Company
 D Company

The Soo Rifles (01 May, 1920) 

 Regimental Headquarters (Sault Ste. Marie, ON)
 A Company
 B Company
 C Company
 D Company

The Sault Ste. Marie Regiment (03 July, 1923) 

 1st Battalion (perpetuating the 119th Battalion, CEF)
 2nd (Reserve) Battalion (perpetuating the 227th Battalion, CEF)

Alliances 

 The Hampshire Regiment (1932-1936)

Battle Honours 

 Arras, 1917, '18
 Hill 70
 Ypres, 1917
 Amiens
 Hindenburg Line
 Pursuit to Mons

References